Ilya Mikhailovich Lifshitz (January 13, 1917 – October 23, 1982) was a leading Soviet theoretical physicist, brother of Evgeny Lifshitz. He is known for his works in solid state physics, electron theory of metals, disordered systems, and the theory of polymers.

Work
Ilya Lifshitz was born into a Ukrainian Jewish family in Kharkov, Kharkov Governorate, Russian Empire (now Kharkiv, Ukraine). Together with Arnold Kosevich, in 1954 Lifshitz established  the connection between the oscillation of magnetic characteristics of metals and the form of an electronic surface of Fermi (Lifshitz–Kosevich formula) from de Haas–van Alphen experiments. 

Lifshitz was one of the founders of the theory of disordered systems. 
He introduced some of the basic notions, such as self-averaging, and discovered what is now called Lifshitz tails and Lifshitz singularity.

In perturbation theory, Lifshitz introduced  the notion of spectral shift function, which was later developed by Mark Krein.

A phase transition involving topological changes of the material's Fermi surface is called a Lifshitz phase transition.

Starting from the late 1960s, Lifshitz started considering problems of statistical physics of polymers. Together with his students Alexander Yu. Grosberg and Alexei R. Khokhlov, Lifshitz proposed a theory of coil-to-globule transition in homopolymers and derived the formula for the conformational entropy of a polymer chain, that is referred to as the Lifshitz entropy.

References

External links
 Page at KPI
 Moscow university site

1917 births
1982 deaths
Scientists from Kharkiv
People from Kharkov Governorate
Ukrainian Jews
Jewish physicists
Full Members of the USSR Academy of Sciences
Foreign associates of the National Academy of Sciences
Soviet Jews
Soviet physicists
Theoretical physicists
National University of Kharkiv alumni
Kharkiv Polytechnic Institute alumni
Academic staff of the National University of Kharkiv
Burials at Kuntsevo Cemetery